Tarło may refer to:

 Tarło, a village in the Lublin Voivodeship
 Tarło family, a Polish noble family

See also
 Tarło (surname)